Gilberte Géniat (February 17, 1916 – June 28, 1986) was a French film actress.

Selected filmography

 Hélène (1936)
 The Citadel of Silence (1937) - Catherine
 Mademoiselle ma mère (1937) - Louise, la bonne
 L'affaire du courrier de Lyon (1937) - La fille Sauton
 Le briseur de chaînes (1941) - Estelle
 Ce n'est pas moi (1941) - Geneviève
 Quai des Orfèvres (1947) - Mme Beauvoir, la concierge
 Scandale (1948)
 Thus Finishes the Night (1949) - Jeannette
 On ne triche pas avec la vie (1949) - Gaby
 Here Is the Beauty (1950) - La femme de chambre (uncredited)
  La caissière (uncredited)
 Quay of Grenelle (1950)
 Lost Souvenirs (1950) - Solange, l'épicière (segment "Le violon")
 Without Leaving an Address (1951) - La cliente de la voyante (uncredited)
 La passante (1951) - La téléphoniste
 The Beautiful Image (1951) - Annette, la bonne
 Matrimonial Agency (1952) - La marchande de billets
 Act of Love (1953) - Mrs. Ethel Henderson (uncredited)
 Zoé (1954)
 Marie Antoinette Queen of France (1956) - Une émeutière (uncredited)
 Les livreurs (1961) - Germaine
 La Belle Américaine (1961) - Mme Zoutin
 L'empire de la nuit (1962)
 Le glaive et la balance (1963) - Une dame du jury
 Carom Shots (1963) - Madame Brossard
 Diary of a Chambermaid (1964) - Rose
 Les risques du métier (1967) - Madame Monnier
 La Prisonnière (1968) - La patronne de l'auberge
 A Very Curious Girl (1969) - Rose
 The Pleasure Pit (1969) - La bouchère
 The Lady in the Car with Glasses and a Gun (1970) - Village Storekeeper
 Distracted (1970) - La speakerine (uncredited)
 Le drapeau noir flotte sur la marmite (1971) - Mme Volabruque
 A Time for Loving (1972) - La concierge
 Such a Gorgeous Kid Like Me (1972) - Isobel Bliss
 The Day of the Jackal (1973) - Paris Apartment Concierge (uncredited)
 Défense de savoir (1973)
 Fear Over the City (1975)
 Les Ambassadeurs (1976) - La boulangère
 The Lacemaker (1977)
 Dernière sortie avant Roissy (1977) - (uncredited)
 Get Out Your Handkerchiefs (1978) - L'ouvreuse du théâtre
 Us Two (1979) - Zézette
 La smala (1984) - La concierge
 Marche à l'ombre (1984) - La retraitée
 American Dreamer (1984) - Embassy Guest #2
 La femme ivoire (1984) - La femme à l'éther
 Hôtel du Paradis (1987) - Caretaker (final film role)

References

Bibliography
 Chiesi, Roberto. Alain Delon''. Gremese Editore, 2002.

External links

1916 births
1986 deaths
French film actresses
Actresses from Paris
20th-century French women